Omar El-Zein (born 12 August 1985 in Lebanon) is a German footballer.

Career
After spending half a season with his first few clubs and scoring 65 goals in one season with amateurs Dostluk Spor Osterode, El-Zein decided to play professionally in Azerbaijan with FK Standard Sumgayit. However, he left after making 4 appearances and one goal due to a change in head coach, who only used local players. In 2010, El-Zein claimed that he regretted that move and that "it [Azerbaijan] was a waste of time".

In 2013, he signed for FSV Wacker 90 Nordhausen in the German Regionalliga, scoring 6 goals in 18 league appearances before playing for 3 more Regionalliga sides.

As a freestyler, El-Zein was nicknamed "Omardinho" after Brazilian international Ronaldinho and once came 2nd in a nationwide freestyle competition.

References

External links
 Omar El-Zein at Soccerway

Living people
German footballers
1985 births
Association football forwards
KFC Uerdingen 05 players
VfV 06 Hildesheim players
FSV Wacker 90 Nordhausen players
BSV Schwarz-Weiß Rehden players
FK Standard Sumgayit players
VfB Germania Halberstadt players
Lebanese emigrants to Germany